Raymond Masao Sawada (born February 19, 1985) is a Canadian former professional ice hockey winger.

Playing career
Born in Richmond, British Columbia, Sawada played at Cornell University from 2004–2008, where he was co-captain as a senior and a member of the Quill and Dagger society. On March 28, 2008, Sawada signed his first professional contract, signing a two-year entry level deal with the Stars. On February 19, 2009, his 24th birthday, Sawada made his debut for the Dallas Stars against the Edmonton Oilers and scored his first NHL goal.

On July 19, 2011, Sawada signed a one-year, two-way contract with the Stars. Unable gain a full-time spot with the Stars during the 2011–12 season, Sawada was reassigned by Dallas from Texas to fellow AHL outfit, the St. John's IceCaps, as part of an AHL trade on March 2, 2012.

After finishing the season out with the IceCaps, and without a contract offer from the Stars, Sawada signed as a free agent to a one-year AHL deal to remain with St. John's on August 9, 2012.

The IceCaps did not offer Sawada another contract after the end of the 2012-13 season and he subsequently signed with the Colorado Eagles in the ECHL.  After playing eighteen games with the Eagles, in which he scored seven goals and eight assists, Sawada decided to play the rest of the season for Tappara in SM-Liiga, the top tier league in Finland.  He helped the team to the SM-Liiga silver medal.  Following the completion of the 2013-14 season, Sawada signed with the Belfast Giants of the Elite Ice Hockey League. In September 2015, Sawada signed for the Oji Eagles of Asia League Ice Hockey.

Career statistics

References

External links

1985 births
Living people
Belfast Giants players
Canadian ice hockey forwards
Canadian people of Italian descent
Colorado Eagles players
Cornell Big Red men's ice hockey players
Dallas Stars draft picks
Dallas Stars players
Ice hockey people from British Columbia
Iowa Stars players
Manitoba Moose players
Nanaimo Clippers players
Oji Eagles players
People from Richmond, British Columbia
St. John's IceCaps players
Tappara players
Texas Stars players
Canadian sportspeople of Japanese descent
Canadian expatriate ice hockey players in Japan
Canadian expatriate ice hockey players in Northern Ireland
Canadian expatriate ice hockey players in Finland
Canadian expatriate ice hockey players in the United States